Lulia is a genus of Brazilian flowering plants in the family Asteraceae.

Species
There is only one known species, Lulia nervosa, native to Brazil (States of Paraná, Santa Catarina, São Paulo).

References

Mutisieae
Endemic flora of Brazil
Monotypic Asteraceae genera